Sizhou, Si Prefecture, or Si Subprefecture was a zhou of imperial China variously placed in what is now Xuyi County, Jiangsu, or nearby Si County, Anhui, both in China. Named for the Si River, it existed intermittently from 580 to 1912, during which time the relative position of a zhou within Chinese administrations varied. The same name Sizhou was used for the town used as the seat of the prefectural or subprefectural government, which also varied, and is preserved in modern Anhui's Si County and Sicheng.

Geography

Tang
The administrative region of Si Prefecture in the Tang dynasty is in the border area of modern northwestern Jiangsu and northern Anhui. It probably includes parts of modern: 
 Under the administration of Suqian, Jiangsu:
Suqian
Shuyang County
Siyang County
Sihong County
 Under the administration of Xuzhou, Jiangsu:
Pizhou
Suining County
 Under the administration of Huai'an, Jiangsu:
Lianshui County
Xuyi County
 Under the administration of Lianyungang, Jiangsu:
Guannan County
 Under the administration of Suzhou, Anhui:
Si County

Qing
Under the Qing, Si Subprefecture formed a division of Jiangnan Province. The subprefectural seat at Sizhou was entirely submerged within Hongze Lake in 1680, along with the nearby Ming Zuling tombs. The seat of government was subsequently moved first to Xuyi in what is now Jiangsu's Huai'an Prefecture and Si County in Anhui.

References
 

Prefectures of the Sui dynasty
Prefectures of the Tang dynasty
Prefectures of the Song dynasty
Prefectures of the Yuan dynasty
Subprefectures of the Ming dynasty
Departments of the Qing dynasty
Prefectures of Yang Wu
Prefectures of Southern Tang
Prefectures of Later Zhou
Former prefectures in Anhui
Former prefectures in Jiangsu